Henry Goldney (Farnell, Affernewell), alias Fernell (by 1517 – 1572/73), was an English politician.

He was a Member (MP) of the Parliament of England for Chippenham in October 1553.

References

1573 deaths
English MPs 1553 (Mary I)
Year of birth uncertain